Dwight Peters (born 23 August 1986) is a semi-professional footballer who plays as a midfielder for Alpha United and the Guyana national team.

Career 
Peters began his career with BeterVerwagting Triumph in 2003, before joining Guyana Defence Force two years later. A short stay with Western Tigers led to a move to Trinidad & Tobago to join Caledonia ANA in 2007, before returning to Guyana Defence Force for a second spell a year later.

He then moved to Alpha United in 2009, where he was part of the Guyana Super National League winning squad for five consecutive seasons until 2014.

Peters made his international debut for Guyana on 22 June 2008, falling to Suriname in a 2-1 defeat during 2010 World Cup qualification. His first international goal then came on 10 August 2008 in the Caribbean Cup, scoring a 90th-minute equaliser in a 1-1 draw with Suriname.

He scored his first international brace in his nation's opening fixture of the 2017 Caribbean Cup qualification campaign, during a 7-0 rout of Anguilla.

International goals
Scores and results list Guyana's goal tally first.

References 

1986 births
Living people
Association football midfielders
Guyanese footballers
Western Tigers FC players
Guyana Defence Force FC players
Guyana international footballers